The mottled tree frog (Philautus poecilius)  is a species of frog in the family Rhacophoridae.
It is endemic to the Philippines.

Its natural habitats are subtropical or tropical moist lowland forests and subtropical or tropical moist montane forests.
It is threatened by habitat loss.

References

Amphibians of the Philippines
Philautus
Amphibians described in 1994
Taxonomy articles created by Polbot